Pilea selbyanorum is a species of plant in the family Urticaceae. It is endemic to Ecuador.  Its natural habitat is subtropical or tropical moist lowland forests.

References

Endemic flora of Ecuador
selbyanorum
Critically endangered plants
Taxonomy articles created by Polbot